Government Polytechnic, Barauni is a polytechnic institute in Begusarai, Bihar, India. It is administered by Department of Science and Technology, Bihar and is funded by Government of Bihar. The institute is affiliated with State Board of Technical Education, Bihar which conducts the semester exams and issues the certificates.

Courses 
The Institute offers six-semester (three years) diploma programmes in engineering.

Admission 
Admission to the first semester (first year) diploma programme in the institute is done through Diploma Certificate Entrance Competitive Examination (DCECE) conducted by Bihar Combined Entrance Competitive Examination Board. The institute also offers lateral entry admissions to the third semester (second year) which is done through DECE (LE) conducted by Bihar Combined Entrance Competitive Examination Board.

References

External links 

 
 
 

Polytechnic institutes in Bihar
Educational institutions in India
Educational institutions in India with year of establishment missing